Lavprisekspressen is a Norwegian coach bus service operating out of Oslo to the cities of Trondheim, and Stavanger. The service is operated by Unibuss Ekspress AS, a subsidiary of Unibuss AS. Both routes have one or two departures per day. Main coaches are Setra S 431 DT.

External links
Lavprisekspressen

Bus routes in Norway
Oslo Sporveier
Norwegian brands
Bus transport brands
Nor-Way Bussekspress